The following  outline is provided as an overview of and topical guide to industrial organization:

Industrial organization – describes the behavior of firms in the marketplace with regard to production, pricing, employment and other decisions.  Issues underlying these decisions range from classical issues such as opportunity cost to neoclassical concepts such as factors of production.

Overview 
 a field of economics that studies:
 the strategic behavior of firms
 the structure of markets
 Perfect competition
 Monopolistic competition
 Oligopoly
 Oligopsony
 Monopoly
 Monopsony
 and the interactions between them

Concepts 
Production side of Industry:
Production theory
 productive efficiency
 factors of production
 total, average, and marginal product curves
 marginal productivity
 isoquants & isocosts
 the marginal rate of technical substitution
Production function
inputs
diminishing returns to inputs
the stages of production
shifts in a production function
Economic rent
 classical factor rents
 Paretian factor rents
Production possibility frontier
 what production levels are possible given a set of resources
 the trade-off between various input combinations
 the marginal rate of transformation

Cost side of Industry:
Cost theory
Different types of costs
opportunity cost
accounting cost or historical costs
transaction cost
sunk cost
marginal cost
The isocost line
Cost-of-production theory of value
Long-run cost and production functions
long-run average cost
long-run production function and efficiency
returns to scale and isoclines
minimum efficient scale
plant capacity
Economies of density
Economies of scale
the efficiency consequences of increasing or decreasing the level of production.
Economies of scope
the efficiency consequences of increasing or decreasing the number of different types of products produced, promoted, and distributed.
Network effect
the effect that one user of a good or service has on the value of that product to other people.
Optimum factor allocation
output elasticity of factor costs
marginal revenue product
marginal resource cost
Pricing and various aspects of the pricing decision
Transfer pricing
selling within a multi-divisional company
Joint product pricing
price setting when two products are linked
Price discrimination
different prices to different buyers
types of price discrimination
Yield management
Price skimming
price discrimination over time
Two-part tariffs
charging a price composed of two parts, usually an initial fee and an ongoing fee
Price points
the effects of a non-linear demand curve on pricing
Cost-plus pricing
a markup is applied to a cost term in order to calculate price
cost-plus pricing with elasticity considerations
cost plus pricing is often used along with break even analysis
Rate of return pricing
 calculate price based on the required rate of return on investment, or rate of return on sales
Profit maximization
determining the optimum price and quantity
the totals approach
marginal approach of production

People 
 Antoine Augustin Cournot
 Heinrich Freiherr von Stackelberg
 Jean Tirole
 Joseph Bertrand
 William Baumol

See also

External links 

 Industrial Organization Society

Industrial organization
Industrial organization
 
Pricing
Production economics